Hugo is a surname and masculine given name of  The English version of the name is Hugh, the Italian version is Ugo. For detailed history and etymology of the name, see Hugh (given name).

Hugo is one of the most popular given names in Europe, ranking as high as #9 in Spain, and #8 in Belgium in 2006.  April 1 is the name day of Hugo in many European countries.

Notable people

Surname
 Adèle Hugo (1830–1915), French diarist
 Chad Hugo (born 1974), American musician and record producer
 Charles Hugo (disambiguation), several people
 Francis Hugo (1870–1930), American politician
 François-Victor Hugo (1828–1873), French writer and translator
 Graeme Hugo (1946–2015), Australian demographer
 Gustav Hugo (1764–1844), German jurist
 Jean Hugo (1894–1984), French painter, illustrator, theatre designer and author
 Jean Hugo (golfer) (born 1975), South African golfer
 Jeanne Hugo (1869–1941), French socialite
 Joseph Léopold Sigisbert Hugo, French general and the father of Victor Hugo
 Julie Hugo (1797–1865), French painter
 Léopoldine Hugo (1824–1843), French socialite
 Ludwig Maria Hugo (1871-1935), German Roman Catholic bishop in Mainz
 Petrus Hugo (1917–1986), South African fighter pilot and flying ace in the Royal Air Force during World War II
 Pieter Hugo (born 1976), South African photographer
 Victor Hugo (1802–1885), French writer, statesman and human rights activist
 Victor Hugo (cricketer) (1877–1930), Australian cricketer
 Walter Hugo, British artist

Given name
 Hugo, Margrave of Hachberg-Sausenberg (died 1444), German noble
 Hugo Alfvén (1872–1960), Swedish composer, conductor, violinist, and painter
 Hugo Alves Velame (born 1974), Brazilian footballer
 Hugo Ball (1886-1927), German author, poet, and founder of the Dada movement and the Cabaret Voltaire
 Hugo Black (1886–1971), US Supreme Court Justice
 Hugo Black Jr. (1922-2013), American lawyer
 Hugo Black III (1953-2007), American lawyer
 Prince Hugo de Bourbon de Parme (born 1997), member of the Dutch Royal Family
 Hugo Cabral (born 1988), Brazilian footballer
 Hugo Cancio (born 1964), Cuban-born American businessman and political activist
 Hugo Chakrabongse (born 1981), Thai royal and singer-songwriter
 Hugo Chávez (1954–2013), politician, former President of Venezuela
 Hugo Corro (1953–2007), Argentinian boxer
 Hugo Eckener (1868–1954), German airship commander
 Hugo Ferreira de Farias (born 1997), Brazilian footballer
 Hugo Ferdinand Boss (1885–1948), German fashion designer
 Hugo Fernández Artucio (born c. 1910s), Uruguayan academic and activist
 Hugo Fernández Faingold (fl. c. 2000), Uruguayan politician
 Hugo Gadd (1885–1968), Swedish Army major general
 Hugo Gellert (1892–1985), Hungarian-born artist
 Hugo Gernsback (1884–1967), American science-fiction publisher
 Hugo Gonçalves Ferreira Neto (born 2001), Brazilian footballer
 Hugo Grotius (1583–1645), Dutch forefather of international law theory
 Hugo Hamilton (disambiguation), various people
 Hugo Henrique Assis do Nascimento (born 1980), Brazilian footballer
 Hugo Houle (born 1990), Canadian cyclist
 Hugo Junkers (1859–1935), German aircraft designer
 Hugo von Kayser (1873–1949), German general
 Hugo Koblet (1925–1964), Swiss champion cyclist
 Hugo Kołłątaj (1750-1812), Polish constitutional reformer and educationalist
 Hugo de Lantins (fl. 1420–1430), French-Flemish composer
 Hugo Launicke (1909–1975), German resistance fighter against the Nazi régime
 Hugo Laur (1893–1977), Estonian actor
 Hugo Leclercq (born 1994), French record producer and musician
 Hugo Leistner (1902–2002), American hurdler
 Hugo Lloris (born 1986), French goalkeeper, plays for Tottenham and France national team
 Hugo Loetscher (1929–2009), Swiss writer
 Hugo López-Gatell Ramírez (born 1969), Mexican epidemiologist and infectious diseases expert
 Hugo Nys (born 1991), French tennis player
 Hugh of Ostia (died 1158), French religious leader
 Hugo Pärtelpoeg (1899–1951), Estonian lawyer and politician
 Hugo Paul Friedrich Schulz (1853–1932), Prussian pharmacist
 Hugo Pratt (1927–1995), Italian comic book creator
 Hugo Reid (1809–1852), Scottish rancher and ethnographer
 Hugo Rifkind (born 1977), Scottish journalist
 Hugo Robus (1885-1964), American sculptor
 Hugo Rodallega (born 1985), Colombian footballer
 Hugo Salmela (1884–1918), Finnish military leader of the Red Guards in the 1918 Civil War
 Hugo Sánchez Márquez (born 1958), Mexican footballer
 Hugo Schmeisser (1884–1953), German weapons designer
 Hugo Schwyzer, American professor and writer
 Hugo Sofovich (1939–2003), Argentine filmmaker
 Hugo Souza (born 1999), Brazilian footballer 
 Hugo Sperrle (1885–1953), German field marshal
 Hugo van der Goes (1430?-1482) Flemish painter
 Hugo Veloso Oliveira Silva (born 1984), Brazilian footballer
 Hugo Viana (born 1982), Brazilian mixed martial artist
 Hugo Viana (born 1983), Portuguese former footballer
 Hugo Vieira (born 1976), Portuguese footballer
 Hugo Miguel Fernandes Vieira (born 1976), Portuguese footballer
 Hugo von Hofmannsthal (1874-1929), Austrian writer
 Hugo Weaving (born 1960), Australian actor
 Hugo White (1939-2014), senior officer of the Royal Navy and Governor of Gibraltar
 Hugo Young (1938–2003), British journalist

Fictional Characters
 Abbot Hugo, a supporting character from Shin Megami Tensei IV.
 Hugo, a character from the Street Fighter III and Final Fight fighting game series 
 Hugo, a character from the  role-playing video game Suikoden III
Hugo, a character from the French role-playing video game Off
Hugo, the younger brother of Amicia de Rune from the video game A Plague Tale: Innocence
 Hugo, the protagonist from Hugo's House of Horrors, Whodunit?, and Jungle of Doom
 Hugo, a troll character and protagonist from the Hugo franchise
 Hugo, younger brother of Victor in Victor & Hugo: Bunglers in Crime and 2nd in command of their criminals for hire business.
 Hugo, one of the gargoyles from the 1996 Disney animated film The Hunchback of Notre Dame
 Hugo, a deputy in training supporting character from the 2016 musical adaptation of Tuck Everlasting
 Hugo DeAngelis, a character in television series The Sopranos. Father in law to series protagonist Tony Soprano and father of his wife Carmela
 Hugo Baskerville, a character in Arthur Conan Doyle's novel The Hound of the Baskervilles.
 Hugo Cabret, the protagonist of The Invention of Hugo Cabret and its film adaptation, Hugo
 Hugo Danner, the protagonist in Philip Wylie's 1930 novel Gladiator"
 Jungledyret Hugo, the main character of the Danish children's film series and a TV show of the same name
 Hugo Granger-Weasley, the son of Ron Weasley and Hermione Granger in the Harry Potter series by J.K. Rowling
 Hugo Drax, villain in Ian Fleming's James Bond novel Moonraker
 Hugo Habercore, the health inspector and secondary antagonist of Bob's Burgers
 Hugo Horton, character from the BBC sitcom The Vicar of Dibley
 Hugo Rask, one of the two main characters of the Swedish award-winning fiction Wilful Disregard 
 Hugo "Hurley" Reyes, a main character in the television show Lost
 Hugo Simpson, Bart Simpson's twin brother from The Simpsons episode "Treehouse of Horror VII".
 Hugo the Abominable Snowman, a minor enemy of Bugs Bunny, loosely based on the yeti legend
 Hugo Strange, a DC Comics supervillain, notably being one of Batman's biggest adversaries

References

Czech masculine given names
English masculine given names
Estonian masculine given names
Finnish masculine given names
French masculine given names
German masculine given names
Italian masculine given names
Portuguese masculine given names
Spanish masculine given names
Masculine given names

cy:Huw
it:Ugo (nome)
hu:Hugó